The 2012–13 Florida Gulf Coast Eagles men's basketball team represented Florida Gulf Coast University during the 2012–13 NCAA Division I men's basketball season. The Eagles, led by second year head coach Andy Enfield, played their home games at Alico Arena and were members of the Atlantic Sun Conference. They finished A-Sun play with a record of 13–5 to finish in second place. In only their second year of full NCAA eligibility, the Eagles won the Atlantic Sun tournament, beating top-seeded Mercer in the championship game, to earn their first ever bid to the NCAA tournament as a No. 15 seed in the south region. Guard Sherwood Brown was named the A-Sun player of the year.

In their NCAA Tournament debut, the 15 seeded Eagles upset 2 seeded Georgetown 78–68. It was the third time in two years and seventh time overall that a 15 seed had upset a 2 seed. With a second round 81–71 win over San Diego State, they became the first 15 seed to win two games in a tournament to advance to the Sweet Sixteen. They lost in the Sweet Sixteen to Florida 62–50 to finish the season 26–11. After the season, Andy Enfield was hired by the USC Trojans to be the head coach. They won the 2013 ESPY for Best Upset. Due to its propensity for acrobatic slam dunks and alley-oops during its unlikely Cinderella run, this specific team became known as "Dunk City" after a song of the same name was posted on YouTube Black Magic and Bambi immediately following their victory over Georgetown, featuring a parody of American rapper Tyga's "Rack City" and played over highlights of the Eagles' win. The "Dunk City" nickname has since expanded to the FGCU men's basketball program as a whole.

Roster

According to Yahoo Sports columnist Eric Adelson, "The out-of-nowhere stories [on the squad] are kind of staggering." Brown began his college career as a walk-on, and was so little-regarded in high school that he does not appear in the database of Yahoo's Rivals.com recruiting site. Starting point guard Brett Comer, who had 24 assists in the Eagles' first two NCAA games, said he had no idea how to play the position when he arrived at FGCU; at Winter Park High School, he took a back seat to future NBA player Austin Rivers. Chase Fieler, whose one-handed alley-oop dunk off a Comer pass was the signature play of the Georgetown game, also does not appear in the Rivals.com database, and did not know how to jump off two feet when he arrived at FGCU. Bernard Thompson, named A-Sun Defensive Player of the Year, was by comparison highly touted; he had offers from budding power VCU and five other mid-majors. Nonetheless, he was not nationally ranked out of high school.

Schedule
 
|-
!colspan=9 style=| Non-conference regular season

|-
!colspan=9 style=| Atlantic Sun regular season

|-
!colspan=12 style=| Atlantic Sun tournament

|-
!colspan=12 style=| NCAA tournament

References

Florida Gulf Coast Eagles men's basketball seasons
Florida Gulf Coast
Florida Gulf Coast